Neuvillette may refer to the following places in France:

 Neuvillette, Aisne, a commune in the department of Aisne
 Neuvillette, Somme, a commune in the department of Somme
 Neuvillette-en-Charnie, a commune in the department of Sarthe

See also: La Neuvillette